Maxmuelleria is a genus of polychaetes belonging to the family Bonelliidae.

The genus has almost cosmopolitan distribution.

Species:

Maxmuelleria aulacoferum 
Maxmuelleria faex 
Maxmuelleria gigas 
Maxmuelleria lankesteri 
Maxmuelleria verrucosum

References

Annelids